André Alexis (born 15 January 1957 in Port of Spain, Trinidad and Tobago) is a Canadian writer who grew up in Ottawa and lives in Toronto, Ontario. He has received numerous prizes including the Windham-Campbell Literature Prize.

Alexis is most well known for his Quincunx Cycle, a series of five novels, each examining a particular theme, set in and around Southern Ontario. His second novel from the cycle, Fifteen Dogs, won the 2015 Giller Prize and brought both Alexis and the cycle into greater prominence.

Biography

Alexis began his artistic career in the theatre, and has held the position of playwright-in-residence at the Canadian Stage Company. His short play Lambton, Kent, first produced and performed in 1995, was released as a book in 1999. His first novel Childhood was published in 1998. Alexis published Ingrid and the Wolf, his first work of juvenile fiction, in 2005.

Alexis wrote the libretto for James Rolfe's opera Aeneas and Dido, which premiered at Toronto Masque Theatre in 2007. He had worked with Rolfe on Orpheus and Eurydice (2004) and Fire (1999).

His novel Asylum was published in 2008, and is set in Ottawa during the government of Brian Mulroney.

In 2014 Alexis published Pastoral, the first in a planned series of five novels on philosophical themes. Fifteen Dogs, the second novel in the series, was published in 2015.  The third novel, The Hidden Keys, was published in 2016.

Alexis was a juror for the 2017 Scotiabank Giller Prize.

Alexis lives and works in Toronto, where he has hosted programming for CBC Radio, reviews books for The Globe and Mail, and is a contributing editor for This Magazine. He is an Adjunct Professor in the MA in English and Creative Writing program at the University of Toronto, and was formerly Writer in Residence at the University of Ottawa, and a Barker Fairley Distinguished Visitor in Canadian Studies at University College in the University of Toronto.

His novel Days by Moonlight was published in 2019, and was longlisted for the 2019 Giller Prize.

In August Metamorphosis: a Viral Trilogy, a three-part audio drama inspired by the COVID-19 pandemic in Canada, was released in conjunction with TO Live, SummerWorks and Canadian Stage. In October, 2020, his career-spanning collection of short stories, The Night Piece, was published by Penguin Random House Canada.

Awards and honors
Despair and Other Stories of Ottawa (1994), was short-listed for the Commonwealth Prize (Canada and Caribbean region). Ingrid and the Wolf was a shortlisted nominee for the Governor General's Award for English-language children's literature at the 2006 Governor General's Awards.

His debut novel, Childhood (1998), won the Books in Canada First Novel Award, and was a co-winner of the Trillium Award. Fifteen Dogs won the 2015 Scotiabank Giller Prize and Rogers Writers' Trust Fiction Prize, and was shortlisted for a Toronto Book Award.

In 2017, he was named a winner of the Windham-Campbell Prize for his body of work.

In 2017, he also won the prize Canada Reads for his novel Fifteen Dogs.

In 2019, he won the Rogers Writers' Trust Fiction Prize again, this time for Days by Moonlight.

Works

 Despair, and Other Stories of Ottawa (1994) 
 Published in the UK as The Night Piece (1999) 
 Childhood (1998) 
 Lambton Kent (1999, drama) 
 Ingrid and the Wolf (2005, children's novel) 
 Asylum (2008) 
 Beauty and Sadness (2010)
 A (2013) 
 Pastoral (2014) 
 Fifteen Dogs (2015) 
 The Hidden Keys (2016) 
 Days by Moonlight (2019)
 The Night Piece: Collected Stories (2020)
 Ring (2021)
 Winter, or A Town Near Palgrave (2022, Coach House Books)

References

1957 births
Living people
Canadian people of French descent
Trinidad and Tobago people of French descent
Black Canadian writers
20th-century Canadian dramatists and playwrights
21st-century Canadian dramatists and playwrights
Canadian male novelists
Canadian male short story writers
Writers from Ottawa
Writers from Toronto
Trinidad and Tobago novelists
Trinidad and Tobago emigrants to Canada
20th-century Canadian novelists
21st-century Canadian novelists
Canadian male dramatists and playwrights
20th-century Canadian short story writers
21st-century Canadian short story writers
Canadian librettists
Canadian children's writers
20th-century Canadian male writers
21st-century Canadian male writers
Amazon.ca First Novel Award winners